Iveta Radičová (born 7 December 1956) served as the first woman prime minister of Slovakia from 2010 to 2012. She led a coalition government, in which she also briefly held the post of Minister of Defence in the last five months of the coalition. Previously she had served as minister of Labour from 2005 to 2006 in the second Dzurinda government.

In the 2009 presidential election Radičová unsuccessfully ran for the office of president of Slovakia.  she stated that she has retired from politics.

Personal life
Radičová was born in Bratislava on 7 December 1956. She has one daughter and is the widow of Stano Radič, a famous Slovak comedian and actor who died in 2005. In addition to her native Slovak, Radičová speaks Russian fluently and has good knowledge of English, German and Polish.

Academic career
Radičová began her academic career studying sociology at the Comenius University in Bratislava, earning a PhD at the Slovak Academy of Sciences in 1981. Radičová worked as a sociologist at the Academy from 1979–1989, coordinating a research team for family policies. In 1990, she pursued postdoctoral studies for a year at the University of Oxford. Upon her return to Slovakia in 1991, Radičová founded the Center for Analysis of Social Policy, one of Slovakia's first NGOs, and served as its executive director until 2005. During this period, Radičová also lectured in the departments of sociology, political science, and social work at Comenius University. In 2005, she was named a Professor of Sociology by the Faculty of Philosophy at Comenius University, making her Slovakia's first female professor of sociology. In Spring 2013, she returned to Oxford, as a visiting fellow.

Political career
Radičová began her political career in 1990 as a member of the Public Against Violence movement, serving as a spokesperson of the party until 1992. She later participated in Slovak part of Civic Democratic Party. She served as its Spokesperson. She had never become its member and never held any position in the party.

From 2005 to 2006, she served as Minister of Labour, Social Affairs and Family in the center-right government of Prime Minister Mikuláš Dzurinda. Radičová was then elected as a member of the Parliament of Slovakia on the party list of Dzurinda's liberal-conservative Slovak Democratic and Christian Union-Democratic Party (SDKU-DS) in the 2006 parliamentary election.

Following the 2006 election, the SDKU-DS went into opposition. Radičová officially became a member of SDKU-DS following the election and was subsequently elected as deputy chairman of the party. Radičová also served as deputy chairman of the parliamentary committee on social affairs and housing.

In 2009, Radičová was selected as the SDKU-DS's candidate in the 2009 presidential election and was also endorsed by the conservative Christian Democratic Movement (KDH) and the Party of the Hungarian Coalition (SMK-MKP). In the first round of the election held on 21 March, Radičová received a surprisingly strong 38.05% of the vote and came in second place to incumbent President Ivan Gašparovič, who failed to receive a majority of the vote. Radičová was defeated by Gašparovič in the second round of the election held on 4 April, receiving 44.47% of the vote. She is the second woman to advance to the second round of a presidential election in Slovak history.

Shortly after her loss in the presidential election, Radičová encountered controversy after casting a parliamentary vote for an absent party colleague in violation of parliamentary rules. As a result of the controversy, Radičová resigned her seat in parliament on 23 April 2009.

Prime Minister
In early 2010, Radičová was selected as head of the SDKU-DS list for the next parliamentary election via a primary election, defeating former Finance Minister Ivan Mikloš. During the election campaign her party ran on a platform of fiscal discipline and pledged to reinvigorate the economy.

In the election on 12 June 2010, the SDKU-DS came in a distant second place with 15.42% of the vote, far behind the center-left Smer party of Prime Minister Robert Fico, which received 34.79% of the votes. However, Fico's coalition partners, the ultra-nationalist Slovak National Party and the national-conservative HZDS, performed poorly, with HZDS failing to win any seats in parliament.  After Fico proved unable to form a new government, Radičová, as leader of the largest opposition party, was asked to form a government by President Gašparovič on 23 June 2010. Radičová was installed as Slovakia's first female prime minister on 8 July 2010, heading a coalition government of the liberal Freedom and Solidarity (SaS), the Christian Democratic Movement (KDH), the ethnic Hungarian Most–Híd party, and Radičová's SDKU-DS.  Between them, this center-right coalition had 79 out of 150 seats.

Radičová pledged that her new government would cut state spending to reduce the budget deficit, while steering clear of tax rises. She stated, "We are ready to take responsibility over the country at a time when it is coping with the impact of a deep economic crisis and the irresponsible decisions of our political predecessors." She also said that Slovakia's guarantee of 4.5 billion euros to the EU stabilization fund was exorbitant, but she also stated that she will not block approval of the scheme within the EU, though she sought to renegotiate her country's contribution to it. Her new government sought, through coalition partner Most-Hid, to rebuild links with Hungary that were badly damaged by the adoption of contentious language and citizenship laws.

Radičová lost a vote of confidence in the parliament on 11 October 2011 after dispute on eurozone bailout leading to the fall of her government. An early election was held on 10 March 2012. Radičová did not submit herself as a candidate again. In 2013, she published Krajina hrubých čiar [Country of Full Stops], a book on her experience as Prime Minister.

Publications 
 Radičová, Iveta. (1993). "Privatisation: The Case of Slovakia," History of European Ideas 17 (6): 735–740. 
 Potůček, Martin, and Iveta Radičová. (1997). "Splitting the Welfare State: The Czech and Slovak Cases," Social Research 64 (4): 1549–1587. Available: https://www.jstor.org/stable/40971243.
 Radičová, Iveta, ed. (1998). Sociálna Politika na Slovensku [Social Policy in Slovakia]. Available: http://archiv.vlada.gov.sk/old.uv/data/files/7195.pdf
 Radičová, Iveta. (2001). Hic Sunt Romales [Here are the Romas]. Bratislava. Available: http://archiv.vlada.gov.sk/old.uv/data/files/7194.pdf.
 Radičová, Iveta, and Ľuba Lesná. (2013). Krajina hrubých čiar [Country of Full Stops]. Bratislava: Ikar.

References

External links 
 

1956 births
Candidates for President of Slovakia
Civic Democratic Party (Czech Republic) politicians
Comenius University alumni
Academic staff of Comenius University
Female defence ministers
Living people
Members of the National Council (Slovakia) 2006-2010
Politicians from Bratislava
Prime Ministers of Slovakia
Defence Ministers of Slovakia 
Labour ministers of Slovakia
Social affairs ministers of Slovakia
Slovak Democratic and Christian Union – Democratic Party politicians
Slovak sociologists
Women government ministers of Slovakia
Women prime ministers
Slovak women sociologists
Female members of the National Council (Slovakia)